BlackJack is a series of Australian television movies created by Shaun Micallef and Gary McCaffrie, and starring Colin Friels. The movies began airing on Network Ten in 2003 and concluded in 2007. They were shown in the United Kingdom on the BBC and UKTV Drama.

After testifying against his former colleagues in a corruption trial Sydney detective Jack Kempson (Colin Friels) is reassigned to a unit charged with entering the details of old cases into a police database. He unofficially begins to investigate unsolved crimes dating back many years.

Episodes

Pilot
 BlackJack: Murder Archive (2003)

First trilogy
 BlackJack: Sweet Science (2004) — Jack discovers that the sons (Alex O'Loughlin and Anthony Hayes) of a criminal gunned down during a football game in 1992 are now following in their dead father's footsteps.
 BlackJack: In The Money (2005)
 BlackJack: Ace Point Game (2005)

Second trilogy
 BlackJack: Dead Memory (2006)
 BlackJack: At The Gates (2006)
 BlackJack: Ghosts (2007)

Main cast
 Colin Friels – Jack Kempson
 Kate Beahan – Julie Egan
 David Field – Inspector Terry Kavanagh
 Marta Dusseldorp – Sam Lawson
 Gigi Edgley – Liz Kempson
 Doris Younane – Christine Vallas
 Sophie Lee – Denise Kennedy
 Todd Lasance – Stephen Hulce

References

External links
 BlackJack (TV Movie 2003), the first instalment, on IMDb
  
 

Network 10 original programming
2000s Australian crime television series
2003 Australian television series debuts
2007 Australian television series endings
Films scored by David Hirschfelder
Australian crime films